Rhoda Bulter (15 July 1929 – 1994), Shetland author, is one of the best-known Shetland poets of recent times.

Biography 
Born Rhoda Jernetta Ann Johnson, in Lerwick, she was the daughter of Jeremiah Johnson, seaman, from West Houlland in the parish of Walls, and Barbara Huano Thomason, from Da Horn, Lower Skelberry, Lunnasting. In January 1949 she married Dennis Bulter, 'Met man' from Lerwick Observatory.

Poetry 
Her first poem, 'Fladdabister', was published in The New Shetlander in 1970, following which she became a prolific writer in the Shetland dialect. For various reasons, her literary legacy is as yet uncollected. Four slim volumes of verse were published in her lifetime – Shaela, A Nev Foo a Coarn (subsequently combined as Doobled-Up), Linkstanes and Snyivveries

Other work 

Rhoda was a frequent contributor to the local Radio Shetland, reading her poems, and forming a double act known as  "Tamar and Beenie" with local broadcaster and freelance journalist Mary Blance.

She also, over a number of years, wrote a regular monthly column for Shetland Life magazine, the fictional Beenie’s Diary.

Bibliography 
Shaela             1976 – Thuleprint. 
A nev foo a coarn  1977 – Thuleprint. 
Doobled-up         1978 – Thuleprint. 
Link-Stanes        1980 – Shetland Times. 
Snyivveries       1986 – Shetland Times.

CD – Bide a start wi' Me 
This 22 track CD, a re-release of her 1976 LP was issued through BleatBeat Records on 9 December 2006 and featured recordings of Rhoda reading the following selection of her poetry:

Bide a start wi' Me
Fladdabister
Gjaan for da airrents
Mairch
Neeborly Feelin
Bül My Sheep
Sea Pinks
Wadder
Rüts
Da Exile
Yule E'en
Delight
Da Bargain Book
A Coorse Day
Da Keepsake
Da Tale O' Da Gluff
Aald Daa
Da Trooker
Why
Hame Again
Da Boags' Spree
It

References

Sources

1929 births
1994 deaths
People from Shetland
Scottish radio personalities
Shetland poets
20th-century Scottish poets